The 2007 Holsten Premier League was a major darts tournament organised by the Professional Darts Corporation. The prize money for the 2007 event increased by almost £100,000 compared to 2006. The overall fund was £265,000 with the eventual winner taking home £75,000. The inclusion of an eighth player meant that the league expanded from 10 to 14 weeks.

Phil Taylor continued his dominance of this tournament by taking the title for the third year in a row. In fact, he remained unbeaten throughout this year's event – and extended his overall unbeaten run in the Premier League to 44 matches.

Qualifiers
The PDC awarded places in the league to the top six players in their world rankings after the SkyBet World Grand Prix in October 2006.

Terry Jenkins' semi-final victory over Peter Manley in Dublin secured the last automatic place in the Premier League at the expense of Wayne Mardle.

The remaining two places were determined by wildcards. The first was awarded after the SkyBet World Grand Prix – the PDC gave this to Raymond van Barneveld. The second wildcard awarded by host broadcaster Sky Sports to Adrian Lewis.

Top six players in rankings at the end of the World Grand Prix and received automatic qualification were
1 Colin Lloyd 549
2 Phil Taylor 545
3 Dennis Priestley 446
4 Peter Manley 441
5 Roland Scholten 433
6 Terry Jenkins 430
Wildcard Raymond van Barneveld
Wildcard Adrian Lewis

The following top 10 players missed out on automatic qualification.
7 Wayne Mardle 427
8 Ronnie Baxter 424
9 Adrian Lewis 421 (Awarded Wildcard, January 2007)
10 Andy Jenkins 420

Venues
The amount of venues was increased from 11 to 15 for the 2007 tournament, with many of the venues used now more larger arenas which would be mainstays of the Premier League for years to come.

Prize money

Results

League stage

1 February – Week 1
 Plymouth Pavilions, Plymouth

8 February – Week 2
 Wolverhampton Civic Hall, Wolverhampton

15 February – Week 3
 Nottingham Arena, Nottingham

22 February – Week 4
 Metro Radio Arena, Newcastle upon Tyne

1 March – Week 5
 Hallam FM Arena, Sheffield

8 March – Week 6 
 AECC, Aberdeen

15 March – Week 7
 Winter Gardens, Blackpool

22 March – Week 8
 SECC, Glasgow

29 March – Week 9
 Rivermead Centre, Reading

5 April – Week 10
 Bournemouth International Centre, Bournemouth

12 April – Week 11
 Cardiff International Arena, Cardiff

19 April – Week 12
 King George's Hall, Blackburn

26 April – Week 13
 Alexandra Palace, London

3 May – Week 14
 National Indoor Arena, Birmingham

Play-offs – 28 May
 Brighton Centre, Brighton

Table and streaks

Table

NB: LWAT = Legs Won Against Throw. Players separated by +/- leg difference if tied.

Streaks

NB: W = Won
D = Drawn
L = Lost

Player statistics

The following statistics are for the league stage only. Playoffs are not included.

Phil Taylor
Longest unbeaten run: 14
Most consecutive wins: 6
Most consecutive draws: 2
Most consecutive losses: 0
Longest without a win: 2
Biggest victory: 8–1 (v. Colin Lloyd, v. Terry Jenkins and v. Peter Manley)
Biggest defeat: Player Undefeated

Raymond van Barneveld
Longest unbeaten run: 4
Most consecutive wins: 3
Most consecutive draws: 2
Most consecutive losses: 1
Longest without a win: 3
Biggest victory: 8–1 (v. Roland Scholten)
Biggest defeat: 4–8 (v. Dennis Priestley)

Terry Jenkins
Longest unbeaten run: 6
Most consecutive wins: 3
Most consecutive draws: 1
Most consecutive losses: 2
Longest without a win: 2
Biggest victory: 8–1 (v. Adrian Lewis)
Biggest defeat: 0–8 (v. Colin Lloyd)

Dennis Priestley
Longest unbeaten run: 5
Most consecutive wins: 3
Most consecutive draws: 1
Most consecutive losses: 4
Longest without a win: 7
Biggest victory: 8–1 (v. Adrian Lewis)
Biggest defeat: 2–8 (v. Phil Taylor)

Colin Lloyd
Longest unbeaten run: 2
Most consecutive wins: 2
Most consecutive draws: 0
Most consecutive losses: 3
Longest without a win: 3
Biggest victory: 8–0 (v. Terry Jenkins)
Biggest defeat: 1–8 (v. Phil Taylor)

Peter Manley
Longest unbeaten run: 2
Most consecutive wins: 1
Most consecutive draws: 1
Most consecutive losses: 2
Longest without a win: 4
Biggest victory: 8–3 (v. Dennis Priestley)
Biggest defeat: 1–8 (v. Phil Taylor)

Adrian Lewis
Longest unbeaten run: 2
Most consecutive wins: 2
Most consecutive draws: 0
Most consecutive losses: 6
Longest without a win: 6
Biggest victory: 8–4 (v. Peter Manley and v. Roland Scholten)
Biggest defeat: 1–8 (v. Dennis Priestley and v. Terry Jenkins)

Roland Scholten
Longest unbeaten run: 2
Most consecutive wins: 1
Most consecutive draws: 1
Most consecutive losses: 3
Longest without a win: 4
Biggest victory: 8–2 (v. Peter Manley)
Biggest defeat: 1–8 (v. Raymond van Barneveld)

References

External links
 Full list of fixtures for the 2007 Premier League Darts
 Official website of the Professional Darts Corporation
 Pictures from the 2007 Premier League Darts

Premier League Darts
Premier League Darts
Premier League Darts